Bad Guys is a 2014 South Korean television series starring Kim Sang-joong, Park Hae-jin, Ma Dong-seok, Jo Dong-hyuk and Kang Ye-won. It aired on OCN from October 4 to December 13, 2014, on Saturdays at 22:00 for 11 episodes.

Plot
Detective Oh Gu-tak will use any means necessary to catch criminals, and his ambiguous moral line often results in him getting suspended for excessive force. Gu-tak comes up with a plan to form a team of "bad guys" to work on cases and hunt down other criminals, and with the rising number of violent crimes in their district, ambitious police inspector Yoo Mi-young signs off on the arrangement.

Gu-tak releases three convicts from jail to form his team: Lee Jung-moon is the youngest member of Mensa with a genius IQ of 165 and doctorate degrees in math and philosophy, but behind his boyish facade is a psychopath serial killer; Park Woong-Cheol is a mob boss who crushed his way to the top of the gangster chain in 25 days, and still remains top dog in prison; and Jung Tae-soo was once a hired hit man who never made a single mistake, but suddenly confessed and turned himself in one day.

Cast
Kim Sang-joong as Oh Gu-tak
Ma Dong-seok as Park Woong-Cheol
Park Hae-jin as Lee Jung-moon
Jo Dong-hyuk as Jung Tae-soo
Kang Ye-won as Yoo Mi-young
Kang Shin-il as Nam Gu-hyeon
Min Ji-ah as Park Seon-jeong
Hwang Seung-eon as Yang Yoo-jin
Park Jung-hak as Lee Doo-kwang
Kim Tae-hoon as Oh Jae-won
Ki Se-hyung as Kang Doo-man
Kim Jae-seung as Woo Hyun-woo
Kim Sung-hoon as Lee Seok-jin
Son Se-bin as Jung Hon-ja, Hyun-woo's fiancée
Jeon Jin-seo as Kim Young-joon
Seo Hye-jin as Shin So-jung
Nam Sung-jin as Kim Dong-ho
Park Jung-woo as Son Moon-ki
Park Hyo-jun as Yoon Chul-joo
Park Sung-taek as Kim Do-shik
Nam Tae-boo as Korean-Chinese man
Kim Byung-choon as Serial killer obsessed with blood
Lee Yong-nyeo as Hwang Kyung-soon
Jang Seon-ho as Park Jong-seok
Kim Hye-yoon as Oh Ji-yun, Gu-tak's daughter

Ratings
In this table,  represent the lowest ratings and  represent the highest ratings.

Awards and nominations

International broadcast 
The drama is available to stream on Netflix with a variety of subtitles in North America, Malaysia, Thailand, Indonesia, the Philippines and Sri Lanka.

References

External links
Bad Guys official OCN website 

OCN television dramas
2014 South Korean television series debuts
2014 South Korean television series endings
South Korean crime television series
South Korean thriller television series
Television series by Urban Works Media